Gerard Chittocque Brandon (September 15, 1788March 28, 1850) was an American political leader who twice served as Governor of Mississippi during its early years of statehood. He was the first native-born governor of Mississippi.

Early life and education
Gerard Brandon was the son of an Irish immigrant, Gerard Chittocque Brandon, who established and ran the Selma Plantation in Adams County, Mississippi, and Dorothy Nugent, the daughter of Irish immigrants Matthew Nugent and Isabel MacBray. The couple moved to Mississippi from South Carolina sometime in 1785.

Brandon was born September 15, 1788, in Natchez, in the Territory of Mississippi, the second child and first son of the family. He was educated at Princeton University and the College of William & Mary and served in the War of 1812. He later practiced law at Washington, Mississippi and was a successful planter, following his father's footsteps, in Adams County, Mississippi.

He married Margaret Chambers on January 18, 1816, in Bardstown, Kentucky. In 1817 Gerard Brandon bought Windy Hill Manor. At his death, Windy Hill Manor was inherited by his daughter, Elizabeth, who married William Stanton. Elizabeth and William's descendants lived at Windy Hill Manor until the 1940s. The last in the line were three unmarried sisters, Elizabeth, Maude, and Beatrice. When the last sister died in 1945, the house sat abandoned until 1965, when it was demolished.

After Margaret Chambers's death in June 1820, Gerard Brandon married Betsy Stanton on July 12, 1824, in Adams County, Mississippi. The governor had a total of eight children with his two wives.

Brandon died at 61 on March 28, 1850, and was buried in a private family cemetery at his Columbian Springs Plantation in Wilkinson County, Mississippi.

Political life
Brandon, a delegate to the constitutional conventions of 1817 and 1832, also helped draft Mississippi's first two constitutions. He served in the Mississippi Legislature and was elected Speaker of the House of Representatives in 1822.

Brandon became governor of Mississippi for the first time upon the death of Walter Leake, serving from Leake's death on November 17, 1825, until January 7, 1826, when David Holmes, the last territorial governor and first governor of the State of Mississippi was again inaugurated as governor.

Brandon became governor of Mississippi again on July 25, 1826, and served until January 9, 1832. A slaveholder himself, he said he considered slavery an evil; his son, however, possessed a fortune in human property, including the kidnapped Henrietta Wood.

References

Mississippi History Now Gerard Chittocque Brandon Fourth and Sixth Governor of Mississippi: 1825–1826;1826–1832. Mississippi Historical Society
The Brandon Children Specifically Governor Gerard Chittocque Brandon

1788 births
1850 deaths
College of William & Mary alumni
Democratic Party governors of Mississippi
People from Natchez, Mississippi
Princeton University alumni
American military personnel of the War of 1812
Democratic Party members of the Mississippi House of Representatives
Mississippi lawyers
19th-century American politicians
People from Washington, Mississippi